Logan Keith Gilbert (born May 5, 1997) is an American professional baseball pitcher for the Seattle Mariners of Major League Baseball (MLB).

Amateur career
Gilbert attended Wekiva High School in Apopka, Florida. He was not drafted out of high school and played college baseball at Stetson University.

As a freshman in 2016, Gilbert appeared in 21 games with five starts, going 2–1 with a 2.74 earned run average (ERA) and 43 strikeouts in 49 innings. After his freshman season, he pitched for the Bethesda Big Train in the Cal Ripken Collegiate Baseball League, posting a 1.70 ERA with 28 strikeouts over  innings. As a sophomore in 2017, he appeared in 15 games with 12 starts, and went 10–0 with a 2.02 ERA and 107 strikeouts in 89 innings and was named the ASUN Conference Pitcher of the Year. After the 2017 season, he played collegiate summer baseball with the Orleans Firebirds of the Cape Cod Baseball League, and was named a league all-star. As a junior in 2018, he pitched to an 11-2 record and a 2.72 ERA over 16 starts and was again named the ASUN Conference Pitcher of the Year.

Professional career
Gilbert was considered one of the top prospects for the 2018 Major League Baseball draft, and was selected 14th overall by the Seattle Mariners. He signed for $3.88 million and was assigned to the Everett AquaSox. However, he was shut down for the season due to an illness before making his first professional appearance.

Gilbert began 2019 with the West Virginia Power and was their Opening Day starter. After pitching to a 1-0 record with a 1.59 ERA in five starts, he was promoted to the Modesto Nuts. In 12 starts with Modesto, he went 5-3 with a 1.73 ERA, striking out 73 batters over  innings. He was promoted to the Arkansas Travelers in July. Over nine starts with Arkansas, he pitched to a 4-2 record with a 2.88 ERA. He did not play in a game in 2020 due to the cancellation of the minor league season because of the COVID-19 pandemic.

On May 13, 2021, Gilbert was selected to the 40-man roster and promoted to the major leagues for the first time. He made his debut that day as the starting pitcher against the Cleveland Indians, and took the loss after allowing four runs in four innings. On June 6, he earned his first career win, striking out seven Los Angeles Angels batters and allowing only one run in five innings.

On September 30, 2022, Gilbert allowed just one run in eight innings of work against the Oakland Athletics. His performance helped the Mariners clinch a playoff spot for the first time since the 2001 MLB season.

In 2022 he was 13-6 with a 3.20 ERA in 32 starts covering 185.2 innings, gave up the highest percentage of line drives in the majors (28.9%), and balls hit against him had the highest average exit velocity (91 mph) of balls hit against all major league pitchers.

Personal life
Gilbert is a Christian. He is married to Aviles Gilbert.

References

External links

Stetson Hatters bio

1997 births
Living people
People from Apopka, Florida
Sportspeople from Orange County, Florida
Baseball players from Florida
Major League Baseball pitchers
Seattle Mariners players
Stetson Hatters baseball players
Orleans Firebirds players
West Virginia Power players
Modesto Nuts players
Arkansas Travelers players
Tacoma Rainiers players